Éraic (or eric) was the Irish equivalent of the Welsh galanas and the Anglo-Saxon and Scandinavian weregild, a form of tribute paid in reparation for murder or other major crimes. In the case of homicide, if the attacker fled, the fine had to be paid by the tribe to which he belonged.

In Irish mythology the éraic takes an important place. In the Oidheadh Chloinne Tuireann, the children of Tuireann owe an éraic to Lugh. Lug set them a series of seemingly impossible quests as recompense. They achieved them all, but were fatally wounded in completing the last one.

See also
Blood money
Damages
Diyya
Galanas
Główszczyzna
Weregild

References

Early Gaelic law
Punishments
Compensation for victims of crime